Sicogón is an island in northern Iloilo, which is part of the municipality of Carles, Iloilo, Philippines. It is named after cogon, a type of grass found in abundance on the island. According to the 2010 census, it has a population of 5,238.

Sicogon was a popular tourist destination during the 1970s, famous for its crystal clear waters and long stretch of white sand beach lined with coconut trees. However, since the 1980s, Sicogon's development has stalled and its popularity faded in favor of the nearby Boracay and other islands in the Philippines.

History

Sicogon Island was declared a tourist destination zone by former President Ferdinand Marcos in 1976.

Modern development
In June 2012, a municipal ordinance that declared Sicogon Island as a tourist destination was recognized by the Sangguniang Panlalawigan (SP) of Iloilo Province. The declaration aims to revive the island as a tourist destination and to open it for commercial use.

A 10-billion development project was launched on May 9, 2013 by the Sicogon Development Corporation (SIDECO), in partnership with Ayala Land, with the intent of reviving Sicogon as a world-class tourist destination. The project included the construction of a five-star hotel and resort, seaport, and an airport on the existing airstrip. This plan was not without controversy, as locals clashed with the developer, causing the town of Carles to send an eight-member police force to mediate between the developer, who claimed that residents had agreed to be relocated voluntarily, and residents who said the developers were forcing them off of public lands. On 8 November 2014 a pact was signed between SIDECO, Ayala Land, and local residents to begin development, with the goal of transforming Sicogon into an ecotourism destination.

Typhoon Haiyan
Typhoon Haiyan passed over Sicogon Island (along with the rest of Panay) on November 8, 2013, damaging fishing boats and nets. Canadian Air Force troops arrived on Sicogon on November 26, bringing medical supplies to the islanders, many of whom were suffering from coughs and colds.

Location and geography
Other nearby islands include Canas Island in the north, Balbagon Island in the east and Panay Island in the west. Tumaguin Island is accessible by foot from Sicogon during low tide. East of the islands is the Visayan Sea, which is a rich fishing ground and source of livelihood for people living in the region. The summit is accessible by trekking and on the summit the entire coastline that surrounds the island can be seen.

Barangays
Sicogon consists of the following three barangays:

 Alipata
 Buaya
 San Fernando

Transport

Air
The Sicogon Airport  is the former airstrip that has been redeveloped and opened in 2018. Charter flights to and from Sicogon to Manila and vice versa will take place in late 2018. It is located in Barangay San Fernando.

Boat
Boats can be chartered from Estancia for less than 2,000 pesos. A public passenger boat leaves from Estancia port normally once daily, at 1 pm. The trip from Estancia to Sicogon takes roughly 45 minutes.

See also
List of islands in the Philippines

References

Islands of Iloilo
Populated places in Iloilo